Demy de Vries is a Dutch fashion model.

Career
De Vries was discovered at a Zara store. She debuted as a Prada exclusive, which is considered to be the highest feat for a model. She has modeled for Bottega Veneta, Hugo Boss, and Christopher Kane. De Vries has also walked for Dior, Valentino, and Kenzo.

In 2018, models.com chose her as a “Top Newcomer” having walked for Prada, Gucci, Hugo Boss, Erdem, Giambattista Valli, Roberto Cavalli, and Altuzarra among others in the F/W season.

References 

1999 births
Living people
Dutch female models
Prada exclusive models
21st-century Dutch women